Buckethead is an American guitarist and multi-instrumentalist. Buckethead's discography currently includes 435 studio albums (388 of which are in the Pike series), 1 live album, 4 special releases, 5 demo tapes, 3 solo DVD video releases, 2 DVD video releases with Cornbugs, 3 music videos, 3 solo videography releases, and 16 videography releases with other artists.

Since 1994, Buckethead has released 6 studio recordings under the anagram of Death Cube K. He has released 74 works with other bands and artists (including his work as Death Cube K). The total number of studio albums, special releases, extended plays, demo tapes, and works with other bands and projects is 384. His guest appearances total 97. His videography releases total 19. In total, Buckethead has been involved with 493 different album projects (as solo or with other bands). As of his 320th solo studio album and his 300th album in the Pikes series Quarry, his total solo studio album running time is approximately 171 hours 55 minutes and 10 seconds.

Solo

Studio albums

Pike Series 

The Pike Series are mini-albums that Buckethead started releasing rapidly in 2011, usually around 30 minutes in length.

Special releases

EPs

Live albums

Singles 
1999: The Ballad of Buckethead
2004: Spokes for the Wheel of Torment
2005: We Are One (feat. Serj Tankian)
2006: Jordan
2006: I Like It Raw (Dedicated to Ol' Dirty Bastard)
2010: The Rising Sun (Dedicated to Japan Disaster Victims)
2018: Mirror in the Cellar (free download for Halloween)
2018: Missing My Parents (free download for Christmas)
2020: Guest of Honor: Paul Frees
2020: Float Like a Butterfly Sting Like a Bee In Honor of Cameron Boyce
2020: Beach Fire Pit
2020: The Whispering Metals
2020: Beyond The Visable
2020: Stump City Breakers
2021: Skylight
2021: Chicken Sticks
2022: Idea
2023: Butterfly Eyes

Spoken Word Albums 
2022: Musical Alchemy (with Red Sulphur) 
2022: Pelican (with Red Sulphur)

Demo tapes 
1989: Brazos (Given to Guitar Player Magazine)
1991: Giant Robot
1991: Bucketheadland Blueprints
1995: Grab Bag#1
1996: Grab Bag#2
1998: Grab Bag#3

Solo DVD videos 
2005: Secret Recipe
2006: Young Buckethead Vol. 1
2006: Young Buckethead Vol. 2
2018: Soothsayer

DVD videos with Cornbugs 
2007: Quackers!
2007: Headcheese

Music videos

Unreleased albums 
Buckethead Plays Disney
Super Diorama Theater
Warm Regards (with Brain and Melissa Reese)

Bands and projects

As Death Cube K 
1994: Dreamatorium
1997: Disembodied
1999: Tunnel
2007: DCK
2007: Monolith
2009: Torn from Black Space
2022: Sub Sea Hollow
2022: Mirror Interval
2022: Magmabot
2022: Bennu Mountain
2022: Salamander Sanctuary

With Alix Lambert and Travis Dickerson 
2008: Running After Deer

With Azam Ali 
2023: TBA

With Barry Michels 
2020: Contemplation Corner

With Bootsy Collins 

1993: Lord of the Harvest (as Zillatron)

With Brain 
1997: I Need 5 Minutes Alone (As Pieces)
2007: Kevin's Noodle House
2010: Brain as Hamenoodle

With Brain and Melissa Reese 
2010: Best Regards
2010: Kind Regards

With Brain and Travis Dickerson 
2008: The Dragons of Eden

With Jonas Hellborg & Michael Shrieve 
1993: Octave of the Holy Innocents (Re-released in 2003)

With Prismo 
2022: Overload (Single)
2022: Chemical Cage (Single)

With Travis Dickerson 
2006: Chicken Noodles
2007: Chicken Noodles II
2009: Iconography
2010: Left Hanging

With Viggo Mortensen 
1997: One Less Thing to Worry About
1998: Recent Forgeries
1999: The Other Parade
1999: One Man's Meat
2003: Pandemoniumfromamerica
2004: Please Tomorrow
2004: This That and The Other (Compilation)
2005: Intelligence Failure
2008: At All
2011: Reunion
2013: Acá (two tracks only)
2016: Seventeen Odd Songs
2018: Godzilla Sleeps Alone

Arcana 
1997: Arc of the Testimony

Cobra Strike 
1999: The 13th Scroll
2000: Cobra Strike II: Y, Y+B, X+Y <hold> ←

Colonel Claypool's Bucket of Bernie Brains 
2004: The Big Eyeball in the Sky

Cornbugs 
1999: Spot the Psycho
2001: Cemetery Pinch
2001: How Now Brown Cow
2004: Brain Circus
2004: Donkey Town
2005: Rest Home for Robots
2005: Skeleton Farm
2006: Celebrity Psychos

Deli Creeps 
1990: Deli Creeps Demo Tape 1990
1996: Deli Creeps Demo Tape 1996
2005: Dawn of the Deli Creeps

El Stew 
1999: El Stew "Extended Play 1.0"
1999: No Hesitation
2003: The Rehearsal
2011: The Dark Night Of A Million Stains – The Rehearsal #2

Frankenstein Brothers 
2008: Bolt on Neck

Giant Robot 
1996: Giant Robot

Gorgone 
2005: Gorgone

Guns N' Roses 
2008: Chinese Democracy

Praxis 
1992: Transmutation (Mutatis Mutandis)
1994: Sacrifist
1994: Metatron
1997: Live in Poland
1997: Transmutation Live
1998: Collection
1999: Warszawa
2005: Zurich
2007: Tennessee 2004
2008: Profanation (Preparation for a Coming Darkness)
2015: Sound Virus

Science Faxtion 
 2008: Living On Another Frequency

Shin Terai / Shine / Shin.E 
2001: Unison
2004: Heaven & Hell
2007: Lightyears

Thanatopsis 
2001: Thanatopsis
2003: Axiology
2006: Anatomize
2015: Requiem

Guest appearances

Multiple appearances with artists 
Anton Fier
1993 – Dreamspeed
2003 – Blindlight 1992–1994

Bernie Worrell
1993 – Pieces Of Woo: The Other Side
1997 – Free Agent: A Spaced Odyssey

Bill Laswell
1993 – Axiom Collection II: Manifestation
1993 – Divination – Ambient Dub Volume 1
1994 – Axiom Ambient – Lost in the Translation
1995 – Axiom Funk – Funkcronomicon
1995 – Axiom Funk - "If 6 was 9" (Single)
1996 – Alien Ambient Galaxy
1996 – Myth – Dreams of the World
1997 – Valis II – Everything Must Go
1998 – Telesterion – Hall of Mysteries
2001 – Points of Order
2007 – Method Of Defiance – Inamorata

Bootsy Collins
2006 – Christmas Is 4 Ever
2008 – The Official Boot-Legged-Bootsy-CD
2011 – Tha Funk Capital of the World
2017 – World Wide Funk
2019 – Bootzilla Records Archives: Volume 1

Company 91
1992 – Company 91 Volume 1
1992 – Company 91 Volume 2
1992 – Company 91 Volume 3

Phonopsychograph Disk
1998 – Ancient Termites
1999 – Live @ Slim's / Turbulence Chest
1999 – Unrealesed (Cassette Only)
2009 – Marsupial's Belly Flop Breaks (Remastered version)
2013 – Unrealesed (CD version)

Freekbass
2003 – The Air is Fresher Underground
2007 – A Sliver of Shiver (Live DVD)
2008 – Junkyard Waltz

Icehouse
1993 - "Big Wheel" (Single)
1993 – Spin One (EP)
1994 – Full Circle
1994 - "Great Southern Land" (German single)
1997 – Masterfile (Japanese release)

Lawson Rollins
2011 – Elevation

Mike Patton with Buckethead and DJ Flare, forming Moonraker
2000 – Live @ The Knitting Factory (Bootleg only)

Refrigerator
1997 – Somehow – Buckethead plays the guitar as well as the samples (cut 3)

Single appearance with artist(s) 
1991 – Henry Kaiser – Hope You Like Our New Direction
1992 – Will Ackerman – The Opening of Doors
1993 – MCM and the Monster – Collective Emotional Problems
1993 – Psyber Pop – What? So What?
1994 – Jon Hassell and Blue Screen – Dressing for Pleasure – Buckethead plays the Electric Bass on Track 10.
1994 – Hakim Bey – T.A.Z. (Temporary Autonomous Zone)
1995 – Buckshot LeFonque - "No Pain No Gain" (Single with remixes)
1995 – Julian Schnabel – Every Silver Lining Has a Cloud
1998 – Bastard Noise – Split W/Spastic Colon
1998 – DJ Qbert – Wave Twisters
1999 – Banyan – Anytime at All
1999 – Ben Wa – Devil Dub
2000 – Double E – Audio Men
2000 – Tony Furtado Band – Tony Furtado Band
2001 – Meridiem – A Pleasant Fiction (re-release in 2009)
2001 – Gonervill – Gonervill
2002 – Fishbone and the Familyhood Nextperience Present: The Friendliest Psychosis of All
2003 – Gemini – Product of Pain
2005 – Bassnectar – Mesmerizing The Ultra
2006 – Gigi – Gold & Wax
2007 – Melissa Reese – Lissa
2017 – Gaudi – Magnetic – guitar on Nocturnal Sonata
2018 – Asterism – Ignition

Soundtracks 
1993 – Last Action Hero (soundtrack)
1993 – Last Action Hero (score)
1995 – Johnny Mnemonic (soundtrack)
1995 – Mighty Morphin' Power Rangers The Movie: Original Soundtrack Album (soundtrack)
1995 – Mortal Kombat (soundtrack)
1996 – Stealing Beauty (soundtrack)
1997 – Beverly Hills Ninja (soundtrack)
1997 – Mortal Kombat: Annihilation (soundtrack)
2001 – Ghosts of Mars (soundtrack)
2001 – Dragon Ball Z: The History of Trunks (soundtrack)
2002 – Scratch (soundtrack)
2004 – Flesh for the Beast (Score)
2005 – Masters of Horror (soundtrack)
2005 – Saw 2 (soundtrack)
2009 – Brüno (Unreleased track "Divide and Conquer" by Giant Robot II)
2012 – Twisted Metal ("Ready to Die" by Buckethead and Brain – re-worked track "Peak" from "Kind Regards" album)
2019 – Sigil for Doom (soundtrack)
2021 – Falling (soundtrack, with Viggo Mortensen and Skating Polly)

Compilations 
1997 – Guitar Zone
1997 – Guitars on Mars
1998 – Night and Day
1998 – Guitarisma 2
1998 – Great Jewish Music: Marc Bolan (otherwise unreleased cover of "20th Century Boy")
1998 – New Yorker Out Loud: Volume 2
1999 – Crash Course in Music
1999 – Horizons
1999 – Music for the New Millennium
2001 – Innerhythmic Sound System
2001 – Bomb Anniversary Collection
2001 – Gonervill presents: The Freak Brothers
2002 – Guitars for Freedom
2002 – The Meta Collection (otherwise unreleased track "Remember")
2002 – Urban Revolutions
2002 – Live from Bonnaroo 2002 – Volume 2 (otherwise unreleased C2B3 song "Number Two")
2005 – Blue Sueños (otherwise unreleased track "Planeta")
2006 – Guitar Hero II ("Jordan")
2006 – The Longest Yard (Jack and the Ripper)
2008 – Fallen Soldiers Memorial (otherwise unreleased track "Buckets of Blood" with Bootsy Collins)
2008 – Guitar Hero III ("Soothsayer")
2008 – Rock Band 2 ("Shackler's Revenge" with Guns N' Roses)

Other 
1992, 2000 – Six String Giant, a bootleg CD

Videography 
Buckethead – Binge Clips (series of seven VHS tapes)
Buckethead – Killer Grabbag of Shards (CD-ROM featuring footage of live shows)
Buckethead - "Viva Voltron"
Buckethead - Guitar One Magazine Instructional Video (CD-ROM, 2006)

With other artists 
 Axiom Funk - "If 6 Was 9"
 Deli Creeps - "Deli Creeps" [1991 Live VHS tape]
 Bootsy Collins - "Funk Express Card"
 Bryan Mantia – Brain's Lessons
 Bryan Mantia – The worst drum instructional video ever DVD
 DJ Qbert - "Inner Space Dental Commander"
 DJ Qbert – Wave Twisters
 Freekbass - "Always Here"

 Guns N' Roses - "Better" (unreleased)
 Praxis - "Animal Behaviour"
 Praxis - "Inferno / Heat Seeker / Exploded Heart"
 Primus – Videoplasty
 Primus – Animals Should Not Try To Act Like People (DVD easter egg)
 Snoop Dogg - "Undacova Funk"
 Thanatopsis - "Pyrrhic Victory"
 Colonel Claypool's Bucket of Bernie Brains – Les Claypool's 5 Gallons of Diesel
 Serj Tankian - "We Are One"
 Bootsy Collins - "Minds Under Construction"
 Bootsy Collins - "Monster Mash"

See also 
List of ambient music artists

References

External links 
 

Discography
Heavy metal group discographies
Discographies of American artists